Jawahar Bharati Degree College, established in 1951, is in the town of Kavali in Nellore district of the state of Andhra Pradesh, India.() Jawahar Bharati draws students from towns in Nellore district.

The institute has an 'A grade' rating and 'Institute with potential for excellence' from NAAC peer committee (UGC, New Delhi).

History
In 1951 it was started as Kavali College or "Visvodaya." A young graduate, D. Ramachandra Reddy, established the college, with a view to impart education to the poor and needy people of Kavali — on 100 acres of land — comprising Visvodaya College (later changed to Jawahar Bharati College), Visvodaya Boys High School, Visvodaya Girls High School and Preparatory School.

Many eminent scholars like Sri Peddada Ramaswamy, Sri S.V.  Bhujangaraya Sarma (as principal), Indaganti Hanumanchastri (Telugu scholar),Bhimavarapu Radha Krishna (as principal), and Kowta Rammohan Sastri (as principal of Bezawada Gopal Reddy School of Fine Arts) worked in this institution. Literary and political figures who worked in the college include K.V. Ramana Reddy (VIRASAM founder member and leading literary critic), G. Kalyanarao, B.V.R aghavulu, ChintaMohan, Subrahmanayam (IAS Special Secretary to CM), Adala Prabhakar Reddy, and Venugopal Reddy.

Notable alumni
 Dr. Amara Rama Rao earned his bachelor's degree at the college. (Dr. Rama Rao is a scientist in the field of HIV vaccine and Immunology. His work on heterologous DNA prime MVA boost approach is in clinical trials in US and is one of the five HIV vaccine candidates entered into clinical trials worldwide.)
 Dr. Venkateswarlu Chamcha is working in a similar field at the Emory Vaccine Center in the USA. He did his PhD in one of India's premier institutes — the National Institute of Virology, in Pune. He says that "I am a student of Jawahar Bharathi." 
 Dr. Kondiah Chukka, former Director General of National Institute for Micro, Small and Medium Enterprises (MSME), Government of India worked for the development of entrepreneurship and MSMEs in the country.

Colleges in Andhra Pradesh
Monuments and memorials to Jawaharlal Nehru
Universities and colleges in Nellore district
Educational institutions established in 1951
1951 establishments in India